The 2020 Summer Olympics, officially known as the Games of the XXXII Olympiad, was an international multi-sport event held in Tokyo, Japan, from 23 July to 8 August 2021. The games were postponed by one year as part of the impact of the COVID-19 pandemic on sports. However, the Games was referred to by its original date in all medals, uniforms, promotional items, and other related media in order to avoid confusion in future years. A total of 11,417 athletes from 206 nations participated in 339 events in 33 sports across 50 different disciplines.

Overall, the event saw two records: 93 nations received at least one medal, and 65 of them won at least one gold medal. Athletes from the United States won the most medals overall, with 113, and the most gold medals, with 39. Host nation Japan won 27 gold medals surpassing its gold medal tally of 16 at both the 1964 and 2004 summer editions. Athletes from that nation also won 58 medals overall, which eclipsed its record of 41 overall medals won at the previous Summer Olympics.

American swimmer Caeleb Dressel won the most gold medals at the games with five. Meanwhile, Australian swimmer Emma McKeon won the greatest number of medals overall, with seven in total. As a result, she tied Soviet gymnast Maria Gorokhovskaya's seven medals at the 1952 summer edition for most medals won at a single games by a female athlete. Bermuda, Qatar, and the Philippines won their nation's first Olympic gold medals. Meanwhile, Burkina Faso, Turkmenistan, and San Marino won their nation's first Olympic medals. However, Turkmenistani athletes had previously competed as nationals of the Russian Empire and of the Soviet Union, in particular during the 1992 Summer Olympics, Turkmenistani athletes competed as part of the Unified Team.

Medals

The medals used for the 2020 Summer Olympics were designed by Junichi Kawanishi. They were manufactured using metal extracted from recycled small electronic devices donated by the public. The case is manufactured from Japanese ash wood dyed with the same colour as the Olympic emblem. The circular lid and the body of the case can be opened like a ring connected by a magnet. The obverse of the medals features Nike, the Greek goddess of victory, in front of Panathenaic Stadium and the Olympic rings.

As a result of safety protocols stemming from the COVID-19 pandemic, athletes were presented with their medals on trays, and were asked to put them on themselves (or each other, in the case of team winners), rather than having them placed around their necks by a dignitary.

Medal table

The medal table is based on information provided by the International Olympic Committee (IOC) and is consistent with IOC convention in its published medal tables. By default, the table is ordered by the number of gold medals the athletes from a nation have won, where nation is an entity represented by a National Olympic Committee (NOC). The number of silver medals is taken into consideration next and then the number of bronze medals. 

In boxing, judo, karate, taekwondo, and wrestling, two bronze medals are awarded in each weight class. Two gold medals (and no silver) were awarded to Mutaz Essa Barshim and Gianmarco Tamberi for a first-place tie in the men's high jump athletics event. Two bronze medals were awarded to Angelina Melnikova and Mai Murakami for a third-place tie in the women's floor gymnastics event.

Key

Changes in medal standings

Key
 Disqualified athlete(s)

See also

 All-time Olympic Games medal table
 2020 Summer Paralympics medal table

References

External links
 
 
 

Medal table
Summer Olympics medal tables